The O-We-Go was an American Cyclecar manufactured in 1914 in Owego, New York.

History 
Designed by Charles B. Hatfield, Jr. of the Hatfield Auto Truck Company in Elmira, New York, the O-We-Go prototype cyclecar was tested for 3 months before production in Owego, New York  began in 1914.

The O-We-Go had a 12-hp twin-cylinder Ives motorcycle engine with a friction transmission on a 104-inch wheelbase. The tandem-seat automobile sold for $385, . The "cyclecar craze" faded as quickly as it started, and the company entered into voluntary bankruptcy in January 1915.

In 1916, C.B. Hatfield, Jr. reconfigured the O-We-Go and sold it in kit form which could be purchased complete, or piece-by-piece under the name Tribune.  The only known surviving O-We-Go is currently on display at the Northeast Classic Car Museum.

See Also 
 O-We-Go By Jim Donnelly from the March 2010 issue of Hemmings Classic Car

References 

Defunct motor vehicle manufacturers of the United States
Vehicle manufacturing companies established in 1914
Vehicle manufacturing companies disestablished in 1915
1914 establishments in New York (state)
1915 disestablishments in New York (state)
Tioga County, New York
American companies established in 1914
American companies disestablished in 1915
Cyclecars
Brass Era vehicles
1910s cars
Motor vehicle manufacturers based in New York (state)
Cars introduced in 1914